Johannes Eppler (1914–1999), also known as Hans Eppler, John Eppler, and Hussein Gaafer, was a World War II Abwehr spy, a German who had been raised in Egypt by his Egyptian stepfather. One of Rommel's spies during the North African campaign in World War II, Operation Salaam led by László Almásy spirited Eppler and Hans-Gerd Sandstede into Cairo although they were both arrested soon after arrival in July 1942. Eppler is the subject of MI5 file KV 2/1467.

After World War II, Eppler told dramatic stories about his spy exploits during the war, but historians have shown that his actual work was ineffective and amateurish.

Fictional portrayals
Eppler is the subject of a book by Leonard Mosley, The Cat and the Mice, and is again referenced in Mosley's The Druid.  Eppler and his radio operator Sandstede are played by Adrian Hoven and Neil McCallum in the British film of The Cat and the Mice, retitled Foxhole in Cairo (1960) (although Sandstede is renamed Sandy).

Another depiction of Eppler's exploits is in the German film Rommel Calls Cairo (1959) based upon Eppler's book of the same name. In this film, Eppler is again portrayed by Adrian Hoven.

Eppler portrayed Rommel in the French film Le Mur de l'Atlantique (1970).

The film and novel The English Patient also reference Operation Salaam and Eppler's activities.

Eppler's history is the same as that of the character Alexander (Achmed) Wolff, the Cairo spy in Ken Follett's "The Key to Rebecca" (1980).

See also
The Key to Rebecca – Ken Follett's novel, partly based on Eppler's activities.

Notes

References
The Cat and the Mice - Leonard Mosley, London 1960
Rommel ruft Kairo - Hans Eppler, 1959
- UK National Archives references
"Deceiving Hitler"

1914 births
1999 deaths
Abwehr
German military personnel of World War II
World War II spies for Germany